William Eduardo Parra Jaimes (b. 1966 ) is one of Colombia's best known journalists. He has worked for Caracol Radio, Reuters, and RCN TV, and in the 1990s was press secretary for then-Colombian President Ernesto Samper. He worked for TeleSUR full-time from 2006 to 2008, and subsequently as a freelance journalist. Parra currently has political asylum in Venezuela, after being charged in Colombia with links with the FARC rebels. Parra denies the accusations, and said in September that his lawyers had received death threats.

Parra was kidnapped for 10 days in December 1997, by men claiming to be members of the Medellin cartel. Arrests were later made of members of Jaime Bateman Cayon's rebel group. In 2000 he fled to Spain following death threats, and in 2005 he was attacked and seriously injured near Bogota.

On 25 September, he interviewed Syrian President Bashar al-Assad.

References

External links
 William Parra: I am innocent and as such I will prove it to justice, Radio Nacional de Venezuela, 8 September 2010

Colombian journalists
Male journalists
Living people
1966 births